FC Spartak Tashkent is an Uzbek football club, playing in the capital, Tashkent.

History

FC Spartak Tashkent is one of the oldest Uzbek football clubs. The first match played by the club was a friendly in 1936. With the support of coach Ravshan Usmankhodjaev, in 2007 the club managed to qualify for the Uzbek League Division One.

In the 2011 season FC Spartak played in Uzbek League Division One, zone "East".

References

External links
 Championat.uz: Uzbek Division One, match results and standings 

Football clubs in Uzbekistan
1936 establishments in Uzbekistan